The Temple of Athena Nike (Greek: Ναός Αθηνάς Νίκης, Naós Athinás Níkis) is a temple on the Acropolis of Athens, dedicated to the goddesses Athena and Nike. Built around 420 BC, the temple is the earliest fully Ionic temple on the Acropolis. It has a prominent position on a steep bastion at the south west corner of the Acropolis to the right of the entrance, the Propylaea. In contrast to the Acropolis proper, a walled sanctuary entered through the Propylaea, the Victory Sanctuary was open, entered from the Propylaea's southwest wing and from a narrow stair on the north. The sheer walls of its bastion were protected on the north, west, and south by the Nike Parapet, named for its frieze of Nikai celebrating victory and sacrificing to their patroness,  Athena and Nike.

Nike was the goddess of victory in Greek mythology, and Athena was worshipped in this form, representative of being victorious in war. The citizens worshipped the goddesses in hopes of a successful outcome in the long Peloponnesian War fought against the Spartans and allies.

History

The cult of Athena Nike was operable in the early sixth century BCE. On the remains of a Mycenaean bastion, a cult image of Athena seated holding a pomegranate in her right hand and holding a helmet in her left was placed on top of a square limestone base. The Sanctuary of Athena Nike was demolished by the Persians in 480-479 BCE and a temple was built over the remains. The new temple construction was underway in 449 BCE and was finished around 420 BCE. The cult was supervised by the Priestess of Athena Nike, who was appointed through democratic allotment. If still in use by the 4th-century, the temple would have been closed during the persecution of pagans in the late Roman Empire.

Greece, which was under the control of the Byzantine Empire, fell to the Ottoman Empire in 1453 when they conquered Constantinople. The temple sat untouched until it was demolished in 1686 by the Ottomans who used the stones to build defenses. In 1834 the temple was reconstructed after the independence of Greece. In 1998 the temple was dismantled so that the crumbling concrete floor could be replaced and its frieze was removed and placed in the new Acropolis Museum that opened in 2009. The Temple of Athena Nike is often closed to visitors as work continues. The new museum exhibit consists of fragments of the site before the Persians were thought to have destroyed it in 480 BCE. Sculptures from the friezes have been salvaged such as: deeds of Hercules, statue of Moscophoros, a damaged sculpture of a goddess credited to Praxiteles and the Rampin horseman, as well as epigraphic dedications, decrees, and stelae.

Architecture

The Temple of Athena Nike was finished around 420 BC, during the Peace of Nicias. It is a tetrastyle (four column) Ionic structure with a colonnaded portico at both front and rear facades (amphiprostyle), designed by the architect Kallikrates. The columns along the east and west fronts were monolithic columns. The total height from the stylobate to the acme of the pediment while the temple remained intact was a modest . The ratio of height to diameter of the columns is 7:1, rather than the more standard 9:1 or 10:1 ratio in Ionic buildings. Constructed from white Pentelic marble, it was built in stages as war-starved funding allowed.

Friezes and parapets

Friezes 
The friezes of the building's entablature were decorated on all sides with relief sculpture in the idealized classical style of the 5th century BC. The orientation of the temple is set up so that the East Frieze sits above the entrance of the temple on the porch side. The north frieze depicted a battle between Greeks entailing cavalry. The south frieze showed the decisive victory over the Persians at the battle of Plataea. The east frieze showed an assembly of the gods Athena, Zeus and Poseidon, rendering Athenian religious beliefs and reverence for the gods bound up in the social and political climate of 5th Century Athens. The west frieze has a good amount of the original sculpting preserved. Similar to the east frieze it is most likely telling the story of a battle, or more specifically a victory. There are multiple corpses depicted (more than any of the other three friezes) and imagery of one about to be killed with some figures wearing helmets. This battle between armies most likely is depicting the massacre of the Corinthians by the Athenians.

Some time after the temple was completed, around 410 BC a parapet was added around it to prevent people from falling from the steep bastion. The outside of the parapet was adorned by carved relief sculptures showing Nike in a variety of activities, including two Nikai setting up a trophy, and all in procession.

Architects Christian Hansen and Eduard Schaubert excavated the temple in the 1830s. The building had been totally dismantled in the 17th century and the stone built into the Turkish wall that surrounded the hill. A primitive anastylosis was carried out in 1836 when the temple was re-erected from remaining parts. A third restoration was completed in Summer 2010. The main structure, stylobate and columns are largely intact, minus the roof and most of the tympanae. Fragments of the sculpted frieze are exhibited in the Acropolis Museum and the British Museum; copies of these are fixed in their place on the temple.

Parapet of Nike 
On the parapet, there would have stood a famous marble statue of a wingless Nike. The positioning of this statue has Nike leaning towards her right foot with her right arm stretching towards her sandal and her clothes slipping off her shoulder. For a while, there has been much debate over what the imagery of this statue is supposed to represent. There are many other uses of Greek sandal-related art found on cups, vases, and even on the friezes of the Parthenon. However, these versions all depict the subjects bending down with both arms stretched out to adjust or tie their sandals. The difference in imagery between one hand and two is what has caused discrepancy behind the meaning of the statue of a wingless Nike. It is most likely that Nike is instead removing or loosening her sandal as opposed to adjusting or putting it on. This use of imagery is thought to be used to demonstrate the action of removing footwear to those entering the temple to pay tribute to Athena, as this was a traditional action of worshiping in this space.

The famous parapet of Nike removing her sandal is an example of Wet drapery. Wet drapery involves showing the form of the body but also concealing the body with the drapery of the clothing. Some friezes are from the Persian and Peloponnesian wars. The friezes contained a cavalry scene from the battle of Marathon and a Greek victory over the Persians at the battle of Plataea. The battles represent Greek and Athenian dominance through military power and historical events.
A statue of Nike stood in the cella, or otherwise referred to as a naos. Nike was originally the "winged victory" goddess (see the winged Nike of Samothrace). The Athena Nike statue's absence of wings led Athenians in later centuries to call it Apteros Nike or wingless victory, and the story arose that the statue was deprived of wings so that it could never leave the city.

Cornice and cyma

Cornice 
The cornice follows standard architectural design and sits immediately above the frieze and wraps around the entire structure. Many sections of the cornice that have been discovered are believed to be part of the Temple of Athena Nike, however, some archaeologists think that some of the pieces found near the temple might not be part it. These pieces of the cornice are lined on the inside with an array of holes, supporting the idea that the cornice was held in place by dowels, which connected it to the frieze. Many of these cornice pieces are so weathered and worn that the dowel holes are no longer visible.

The cornice stretches flat and with no moldings that would create a design. If there had been a design, it would not be sculptural. There is evidence that would suggest that the cornice would have at one point been painted. However, because the architecture has been worn for such a long time, any knowledge of what the design could have been is long lost.

Cyma 
Just above the cornice, on the north and south sides of the temple, rests the cyma. They sit at an angle on both sides, creating the slope that makes up the roofing and the pediment. Stretching along the cyma is an order of lion heads that extend outward. At each end of the cyma, where the corners would turn into the east and west faces of the temple, there are cuttings just above the cyma where an akroteria would have been placed.

Akroteria 
The main body of the central statue that made up the akroteria was composed of bronze, not marble. There is evidence of gold foiling and gold wiring through the main bronze core. Researchers have hypothesized on the form of the statue, but there is no trace of the original sculpture to indicate what the central akroteria really looked like. The same can be said for the statues that would make up the east and west akroteria. Both were made of bronze and it is impossible to know what the figures could have been. Theories around the figure of the central statue include the winged horse Pegasus or the monster Chimera. However, these theories may be unlikely as the proportions of these animals’ bodies would not match where their feet would be placed in the akroteria's base block.

Statue theories 
A possible theory for the central akroteria would be a bronze tripod, similar to the ones that would have been on the Temple of Zeus in Olympia. This hypothesis has not been discredited for a few reasons: 1) It would be a realistic answer for the shape of the statue since the tripods dimensions would fit in the cuttings of the supporting block (unlike the animal theories). 2) A tripod would have been a likely statue to have a bronze core when serving as an acroteria. 3) The Tripod is commonly used as a symbol of victory.

A commemorative trophy is another theory for the central akroteria that has yet to be disproven for many of the same reasons as the tripod. There are also some sculptures on the surrounding parapets that depict Nike setting up a trophy.

The last theory that has yet to be discredited is a central akroteria of a flying Nike. The idea is that a statue of a winged Nike would have been set just above a shield and on either side of her would have stood a Nikai holding weapons dedicated to the goddess. The akroteria at the temple of Zeus in Olympia would be a good statue for comparison with the exception of the two Nikai. This shape for the central akroteria would explain the cuttings in the supporting block that would not have matched with some of the other forms.

See also
 List of Ancient Greek temples
 Architecture of Ancient Greece
 Art of Ancient Greece
 Classical architecture
 Classical sculpture

References

Sources
 Greek architecture Encyclopædia Britannica, 1968.
 Greece: From Mycenae to the Parthenon, Henri Stierlin, TASCHEN, 2004.

Footnotes

External links

Dr. J's Illustrated Temple of Athena Nike
Temple of Athena Nike Frieze Pictures
The temple of Athena Nike - Hellenic Ministry of Culture and Tourism
Temple of Athena Nike, Athens
Temple of Athena Nike, Athens
Temple of Athena Nike, Athens 
  The Temple of Athena Nike: A Small Shrine Dedicated To One of Athena's
Temple of Athena Nike

5th-century BC religious buildings and structures
Temples in ancient Athens
Ancient Greek buildings and structures in Athens
Acropolis of Athens
Nike